Thomas Greytak is the Lester Wolfe Professor of Physics, Emeritus at the Massachusetts Institute of Technology. His areas of research include experimental low temperature condensed matter physics and superfluid systems. Currently, he is working with Daniel Kleppner on research concerning ultra cooled atomic hydrogen.

All of his academic degrees are from MIT (SB and MS degrees in Electrical Engineering (1963) and a PhD in Physics (1967)).

He was married to Elizabeth Bardeen, daughter of Nobel Laureate, John Bardeen.

References

MIT School of Engineering alumni
Living people
21st-century American physicists
Year of birth missing (living people)
MIT Department of Physics alumni
Massachusetts Institute of Technology School of Science faculty